Gerda Ranz (born 29 November 1944) is a German middle-distance runner. She competed in the women's 1500 metres at the 1972 Summer Olympics.

References

1944 births
Living people
Athletes (track and field) at the 1972 Summer Olympics
German female middle-distance runners
Olympic athletes of West Germany
Place of birth missing (living people)
20th-century German women